Mahboob Rahman Ruhel (born  8 July 1970) is a Bangladeshi businessman and film producer. He won Bangladesh National Film Award for Best Film and Best Screenplay for the film No  Dorai (2019). He is the founder Chairman of ShowMotion Limited  which owns the  Star Cineplex movie theaters. Also, he is the managing director of Sayeman Beach Resort.

Background and education
Mahboob's father Mosharraf Hossain is a Awami League politician, the incumbent Jatiya Sangsad member from the Chittagong-1 constituency and a former minister of the government of Bangladesh. Mahboob earned his bachelor's degree in information systems and computer science from the University of Texas at Arlington and an MBA from Aalto University Executive Education.

References

External links
 

Living people
1970 births
University of Texas at Arlington alumni
Bangladeshi film producers
Bangladeshi businesspeople
Best Screenplay National Film Award (Bangladesh) winners